Harvey Adams (1889, Warrington, England – 1960, Australia) was an English actor and director who worked extensively in film, stage and radio.

He moved to Australia in 1924 for work after a long career, played leading man for Muriel Starr from 1925 to 1930, in later years also serving as producer for many of her shows, and for other companies after she left in 1930, earning a reputation for meticulous attention to detail. He remained in Australia for most of the rest of his life.

Filmography

References

External links

Harvey Adams Australian theatre credits at AusStage

20th-century English male actors
English directors
English male film actors
1893 births
1960 deaths
English emigrants to Australia